The RAND Journal of Economics (usually called RAND Journal or simply Rand ) is a quarterly peer-reviewed academic journal of economics published by Wiley-Blackwell on behalf of the RAND Corporation. It publishes theoretical and empirical papers on industrial organization and related topics. According to the Journal Citation Reports, the journal has a 2020 impact factor of 1.986.

History
The journal was established in 1970 by AT&T's Bell Labs economics group as The Bell Journal of Economics and Management Science. From 1975 to 1983 it was titled The Bell Journal of Economics. In 1984, after transfer to the RAND Corporation, it acquired its present name.

See also

List of economics journals

References

External links

Economics journals
Publications established in 1970
Quarterly journals
RAND Corporation
Wiley-Blackwell academic journals
English-language journals